Mariano Gabiel Celasco (born 2 October 1986) is an Argentine footballer.

He is remembered for his spell at Rangers de Talca.

External links

1986 births
Living people
Argentine footballers
Tiro Federal footballers
Argentine expatriate footballers
Rangers de Talca footballers
Expatriate footballers in Chile
Association football midfielders
Footballers from La Plata